Ardatov (Ordańbuje) is a town and the administrative center of Ardatovsky District of the Republic of Mordovia, Russia, located on the Alatyr River  northeast of Saransk, the capital of the republic. As of the 2010 Census, its population was 9,400.

History
It was first mentioned in 1671 as the village of Ardatovo and was granted town status in 1780.

Administrative and municipal status
Within the framework of administrative divisions, Ardatov serves as the administrative center of Ardatovsky District. As an administrative division, it is incorporated within Ardatovsky District as the town of district significance of Ardatov. As a municipal division, the town of district significance of Ardatov is incorporated within Ardatovsky Municipal District as Ardatov Urban Settlement.

Notable people
 

Iya Arepina (1930–2003), Soviet/Russian actress
Mikhail Nikolaevich Gernet (1874–1953), Soviet criminologist and legal historian
Ivan Pozharsky (1905–1938), Soviet military commissar and posthumous Hero of the Soviet Union

References

Notes

Sources

External links
Official website of Ardatov 
Directory of organizations in Ardatov 

Cities and towns in Mordovia
Ardatovsky Uyezd (Simbirsk Governorate)
Ardatovsky District, Republic of Mordovia